Psychoanalytic institutes and societies in the United States are often linked together, though a distinction may be made between the functions of the institutes (mainly training, education, and research) and the societies (other professional activities including advocacy and networking). Some local psychoanalytic organizations have both words in their title while others have only one or the other.

Psychoanalytic institutes are organizations that train psychoanalysts and psychoanalytically oriented psychotherapists, provide continuing education for psychoanalytically oriented mental health professionals, and/or carry out psychoanalytically informed research in mental health or social sciences and humanities. Psychoanalytic societies are local or regional professional associations of psychoanalysts and sometimes other psychoanalytically oriented professionals.

Psychoanalytic institutes in the United States may be affiliated with either the American Psychoanalytic Association (APsaA), the International Psychoanalytic Association (IPA), or both. The two associations differ slightly in their training guidelines over such things as length and frequency of so-called "control cases" (patients seen for psychoanalysis as part of the training of candidate) or of the candidates themselves. The two organizations also historically differed in their rules for allowing different types of professionals to undergo psychoanalytic training (e.g., for many years APsaA only allowed physicians to undergo psychoanalytic training, while IPA allowed psychologists and others to become psychoanalysts). The two associations historically also had different attitudes towards theoretical schools within psychoanalysis such as Kleinian or Lacanian approaches. Since 2001, some psychoanalytic institutes have been accredited by the Accreditation Council for Psychoanalytic Education, Inc. (ACPEinc).

Overview 

There are at several philosophical and psychotherapeutic traditions related to Freudian psychoanalysis. One of the largest are Jungian psychoanalysis or analytic psychology, based on the works of Freud's early colleague and one-time protege Carl Gustav Jung. The International Association for Analytical Psychology (IAAP) is the international accrediting and regulatory body for all Jungian societies and groups of analytical psychology practitioners, trainees and affiliates. Another, particularly prominent in Europe and Latin America, is Lacanian psychoanalysis, based on the work of the French psychoanalyst Jacques Lacan. The World Association of Psychoanalysis (WAP) was founded in 1992 and groups together a number of regional Lacanian associations. While some psychoanalysts and psychoanalytic institutes associated with APsaA or IPA may use or teach some Jungian or Lacanian concepts and techniques, in practice these have become somewhat separate traditions, with separate journals, professional societies, accreditation, and so on. Consequently, Jungian and Lacanian societies and institutes are not listed here unless they are also associated with either APsaA or IPA.

Many American psychoanalytic institutes are stand-alone, nonprofit, educational institutions of relatively small size. A handful are affiliated with major universities: Columbia University Center for Psychoanalytic Training and Research; New York University's Postdoctoral Program in Psychotherapy and Psychoanalysis; Emory University Psychoanalytic Institute (EUPI). A small number are independently accredited graduate schools: Boston Graduate School of Psychoanalysis.

It is difficult to give a single "foundation date" for many of the institutes and societies. Some began as independent study groups or as sponsored affiliates of more established psychoanalytic institutes or societies in other cities. Most went through a process of accreditation by APsaA and/or IPA, which can take years to complete and which has several stages from recognized study group through provisional institute to independent institute or training institute status. Most were chartered as nonprofit organizations or accredited at the state level as educational organizations separately from their IPA/APsaA accreditation. Consequently, some foundation dates are approximate and some organizations have multiple significant dates listed.

There are also several institutions that are hard to categorize and have therefore been omitted, such as the Menninger Clinic in Houston, a prominent training program in psychiatry and clinical psychology with strong tradition of training in psychoanalytic approaches. The Menninger Clinic was previously closely connected with the Topeka Psychoanalytic Society; however, Menninger itself does not appear to be independently recognized by APsaA or IPA as a psychoanalytic institute, or to have an explicitly affiliated psychoanalytic society at present. The Wright Institute in Berkeley, California and the formerly affiliated but now independent Wright Institute Los Angeles, and the Austen Riggs Center in Massachusetts, similarly have long traditions of training psychoanalytically informed clinicians, but are not chartered as psychoanalytic institutes.

Some of the psychoanalytic institutes offer psychoanalytic licensure tracks of study, but not all.

List 
 American Institute for Psychoanalysis (AIP) - the second oldest continuously functioning institute in New York City, and third oldest institute in the United States, based on the growth-oriented philosophy Karen Horney pioneered in psychoanalysis.
 Berkshire Psychoanalytic Institute (BPI) was founded in 2001 in Stockbridge, Massachusetts. It is recognized by APsaA.
 Boston Graduate School of Psychoanalysis was founded in 1973. Its main campus is in Brookline, Massachusetts.
 Boston Psychoanalytic Society and Institute is the third-oldest psychoanalytic institute in the United States, founded in 1932 by Franz Alexander. It is affiliated with both APsaA and IPA.
 Center for Modern Psychoanalytic Studies
 Center for Psychoanalytic Studies in Houston, Texas, began as a study group in the Houston-Galveston area in 1964, in association with the New Orleans Psychoanalytic Institute (NOPI). In 1974, it began operating as a geographical extension of the NOPI, offering full training in psychoanalysis as the Houston-Galveston Psychoanalytic School. Provisional status with APsaA was granted in 1976 and full status in May 1979 as the Houston-Galveston Psychoanalytic Institute. It has associations with Baylor College of Medicine (Houston) and the University of Texas Health Science Center at Houston, as well as affiliates in Austin and in San Antonio.
 Center for Psychotherapy and Psychoanalysis of New Jersey https://cppnj.org
 Chicago Psychoanalytic Institute (formerly Institute for Psychoanalysis until it was renamed in May 2018), is the second-oldest in the United States, founded in February 1932.
 Columbia University Center for Psychoanalytic Training and Research was founded in 1945. It is part of the Department of Psychiatry of the Columbia University College of Physicians and Surgeons.
 Denver Institute for Psychoanalysis and the Denver Psychoanalytic Society were begun in the 1960s, with the first class enrolled in 1968.
 Emory University Psychoanalytic Institute (EUPI) in Atlanta, Georgia, is a part of the Emory University School of Medicine's Department of Psychiatry and Behavioral Sciences and is affiliated with the Atlanta Psychoanalytic Society. It is also an Accredited Training Institute of the American Psychoanalytic Association (APsaA). The precursor of EUPI was founded around 1964 with classes beginning in 1965.
 Greater Kansas City and Topeka Psychoanalytic Center and Institute (GKCPI) in Kansas City, Missouri
 Harlem Family Institute (HFI) was founded in New York City in 1991 with the goal of providing psychoanalytic training for candidates from diverse backgrounds, and long-term psychotherapeutic and emotional-support  for struggling and at-risk youth and their parents in New York's schools in underserved neighborhoods.
 Institute for Contemporary Psychoanalysis (ICP) in Los Angeles was founded in 1990–1991 with an emphasis on contemporary approaches to psychoanalysis, particularly Self Psychology and Intersubjective approaches.
 Institute of Contemporary Psychotherapy + Psychoanalysis (ICP+P) was founded in Washington, DC, in 1994 by Joseph Lichtenberg and Rosemary Segalla.
 Institute for Psychoanalytic Training and Research (IPTAR) in New York City was founded in 1958.
 Institute for the Psychoanalytic Study of Subjectivity (IPSS) was founded in 1987 in New York City by George Atwood, James Fosshage, Frank Lachmann, and Robert Stolorow.
 Los Angeles Institute and Society for Psychoanalytic Studies (LAISPS) was founded in 1970.
 National Psychological Association for Psychoanalysis (NPAP) was established in New York City by Theodore Reik in 1948, in response to the controversy over lay analysis and the question of the training of psychoanalysts in the States. It continues to have a Reikian orientation to psychoanalysis.
 New Center for Psychoanalysis (NCP) in Los Angeles was created in 2005 from the merger of two institutes: the Los Angeles Psychoanalytic Society and Institute (LAPSI) and the Southern California Psychoanalytic Institute and Society (SCPIS). These, in turn, were the two oldest and largest successors to the original Los Angeles Institute. The New Center is affiliated with both APsaA and IPA.
 Newport Center for Psychoanalytic Studies was begun in Newport Beach, California, in 1975 by psychologist Lawrence Hedges as a series of study groups and visiting lecturers. It was formally chartered as an educational institute in 1983.
 New York Psychoanalytic Society & Institute, founded in 1911 by Abraham Brill, is the oldest psychoanalytic organization in the United States.
 New York University Postdoctoral Program in Psychotherapy and Psychoanalysis was established at NYU by Bernard N. Kalinkowitz in 1961.
 Object Relations Institute for Psychotherapy and Psychoanalysis (ORI) was founded in 1991, with curriculum based on extension of the British Object Relations psychoanalytic school, and it is chartered by NYS Board of Regents in 1993.
 Northern California Society for Psychoanalytic Psychology (NCSPP) is based in San Anselmo, California, in the San Francisco Bay Area.
 Oklahoma Society for Psychoanalytic Studies was founded in 1989.
 Oregon Psychoanalytic Center (OPC) in Portland, Oregon
 Psychoanalytic Institute of New England (PINE)
 Psychoanalytic Center of California (PCC) was established in Los Angeles in the 1980s with a specific focus on the works of Melanie Klein and her associates; it joined the International Psychoanalytical Association in 1989.
 Psychoanalytic Center of Philadelphia (PCOP) was established in 2000 by the merger of the Philadelphia Association for Psychoanalysis and the Philadelphia Psychoanalytic Institute and Society. It is an Approved Institute of the American Psychoanalytic Association and provides training in Psychoanalysis and Psychotherapy
 Psychoanalytic Institute of Northern California (PINC) was founded in 1989 and became a component society of the IPA in July 2009.
 Psychoanalytic Psychotherapy Study Center (PPSC), with a Four-Year Program in Psychoanalysis, was founded in New York in 1986. It is a member institute of the National Association for the Advancement of Psychoanalysis.
 St. Louis Psychoanalytic Institute
 San Diego Psychoanalytic Center (SDPC)
 San Francisco Center for Psychoanalysis was founded in 1942 as California Psychoanalytic Society and was later renamed the San Francisco Psychoanalytic Society and Institute. In 2007, it was combined with the San Francisco Foundation for Psychoanalysis that was founded in 1991. The new entity is called the San Francisco Center for Psychoanalysis. The Sacramento Psychoanalytic Society is an affiliate of the San Francisco Center for Psychoanalysis.
 Seattle Psychoanalytic Society & Institute (SPSI) in Seattle, Washington, began as the Seattle Psychoanalytic Training Center in 1946. In 1964, the Seattle Psychoanalytic Society & Institute (SPSI) gained independent status as an Institute of the American Psychoanalytic Association.
 Western New England Institute for Psychoanalysis in New Haven, Connecticut, was established provisionally in 1952 and fully recognized in 1956 by the American Psychoanalytic Association.
 William Alanson White Institute (WAWI) was founded in 1943 in New York City. Founding members were Erich Fromm and Clara Thompson, joined by Harry Stack Sullivan, Frieda Fromm-Reichmann, David Rioch and Janet Rioch.

See also 
List of schools of psychoanalysis

References

Further reading

External links
Approved Training Institutes – APsaA

Psychology institutes
Psychology lists
Psychology organizations based in the United States